The bandula barb (Pethia bandula) is a species of cyprinid endemic to Sri Lanka where it is only known from near Galapitamada in the Warakapola Divisional Secretariat. As this critically endangered species only was known from a single unprotected site where the population consists of an estimated 1,000 individuals, a second "insurance population" was established in 2014 by a team of IUCN scientists in cooperation with Sri Lanka's Forest Department, the Department of Wildlife Conservation and local communities.

On 24 December 2018, National Geographic reported that the bandula barb was the 9,000th animal photographed for The Photo Ark by Joel Sartore.

References

Pethia
Barbs (fish)
Fish described in 1991
Taxonomy articles created by Polbot